Mercy Health, formerly Catholic Health Partners, is a Catholic health care system with locations in Ohio and Kentucky. Cincinnati-based Mercy Health operates more than 250 healthcare organizations in Ohio and Kentucky. Mercy Health is the second largest health system in Ohio and the state's fourth-largest employer.

On September 1, 2018 Mercy Health and Bon Secours Health System USA combined to become Bon Secours Mercy Health. Bon Secours Mercy Health headquarters are co-located with Mercy Heath in Cincinnati, Ohio.

History
The Religious Sisters of Mercy (R.S.M.) were founded in 1831 in Dublin, Ireland, by Catherine McAuley. The sisters arrived in the United States in 1843. Eventually thirty-nine separate Sisters of Mercy congregations across the United States and Latin America developed from that first convent in Pittsburgh. The Sisters of Mercy established hospitals in Hamilton, Ohio in 1892 and in Wilkes-Barre, Pennsylvania, in 1898.

The Sisters of Charity of Montreal
In 1855 Toledo, Ohio was in the midst of a cholera and malaria epidemic. Father Augustine Campion, pastor of St. Francis de Sales Church, asked the Sisters of Charity of Montreal for assistance. They established St. Vincent Hospital. In 1983 the Sisters of Charity of Montreal established Covenant Health Systems to direct, support and conduct their health care, elder care and social service systems throughout the United States. St. Vincent's Medical Center in Toledo joined Catholic Health Partners, while Covenant Health Systems retained management of the facilities in New England.

Sisters of the Holy Humility of Mary
The sisters entered health care in 1879 when St. Joseph's Infirmary was built, the first Catholic hospital in the Mahoning Valley, which functioned until 1910 when the sisters were given charge of St. Elizabeth Hospital in Youngstown, Ohio. Two more Ohio hospitals came under the direction of the sisters - St. Joseph Health Center in Warren in 1924 and St. Elizabeth in Boardman. By 2011, Humility of Mary Health Partners was formed to oversee the administration and management of St. Elizabeth Hospital and St. Joseph Health Center and several other area health-care services. By 2014, the hospitals were run by Catholic Health Partners.

Name changes
Incorporated in 1986 as Mercy Health Care Systems, in 1997 the name was changed to Catholic Healthcare Partners to reflect the multiple religious communities that sponsored it. It was later shortened to Catholic Health Partners to reflect its growing emphasis on preventative care and overall wellness. It became Mercy Health in 2014.

Sponsors
These Catholic organizations co-sponsor Mercy Health: the Sisters of Mercy, South Central Community; the Sisters of Mercy, Mid-Atlantic Community; the Sisters of Humility of Mary; and the Sisters of Charity of Montreal.

Hospitals
Mercy Health serves seven markets: Cincinnati, Toledo, Youngstown, Lima, Lorain and Springfield in Ohio and Paducah and Irvine in Kentucky.

Cincinnati, Ohio
In the Cincinnati area, there are five hospitals:

 Mercy Health Anderson Hospital
 Mercy Health Clermont Hospital
 Mercy Health Fairfield Hospital
 Mercy Health West Hospital
 The Jewish Hospital – Mercy Health

And four additional 24-hour standalone emergency rooms:

 Mercy Health Harrison Medical Center
 Mercy Health Mt. Orab Medical Center
 Mercy Health Queen City Medical Center
 Mercy Health Rookwood Medical Center

Lima, Ohio 
One hospital in Allen County:

 Mercy Health St. Rita's Medical Center

One additional 24-hour standalone emergency room:

 Mercy Health Putnam County Emergency Services

Lorain County, Ohio 
 Mercy Health Allen Hospital
 Mercy Health Lorain Hospital

Springfield, Ohio 
 Mercy Health Urbana Hospital
 Mercy Health Springfield Regional Medical Center

One additional 24-hour standalone emergency room:

 Mercy Health Dayton Springfield Emergency Center

Toledo, Ohio 
Eight hospitals in Toledo and the Northwest Ohio area:

 Mercy Health Children's Hospital
 Mercy Health Defiance Hospital 
 Mercy Health Perrysburg Hospital
 Mercy Health St. Anne Hospital
 Mercy Health St. Charles Hospital
 Mercy Health St. Vincent Medical Center
 Mercy Health Tiffin Hospital
 Mercy Health Willard Hospital

And one additional 24-hour standalone emergency room:

 Mercy Health Sylvania Medical Center

Youngstown, Ohio 
Three hospitals in the Mahoning Valley area:

 Mercy Health St. Elizabeth Boardman Hospital
 Mercy Health St. Elizabeth Youngstown Hospital
 Mercy Health St. Joseph Warren Hospital

One additional 24-hour standalone emergency room:

 Mercy Health Austintown Medical Center

Irvine, Kentucky
 Mercy Health Marcum and Wallace Hospital

Paducah, Kentucky 
 Mercy Health Lourdes Hospital

See also
 Bon Secours (Virginia & South Carolina)
 Bon Secours Charity Health System
 Bon Secours Sisters

References

External links 
 
 Bon Secours Mercy Health

Hospital networks in the United States
Hospitals in Cincinnati
Organizations based in Ohio
Catholic hospital networks in the United States